NGC 382 is an elliptical galaxy located in the constellation Pisces. Its discovery (on 4 November 1850) has been credited to William Parsons.

Group of galaxies 

NGC 382 is in a group of galaxies with galaxies NGC 375, NGC 379, NGC 380, NGC 383, NGC 384, NGC 385, NGC 386, NGC 387 and NGC 388.

References

External links 
 
 NGC 382 by Spider-Seds
 Aladin Previewer

0382
Elliptical galaxies
Pisces (constellation)
18501104
003981